Sitapur is a city and a municipal board in Sitapur district in the state of Uttar Pradesh, India. It is located 90 kilometres north of state capital, Lucknow. The traditional origin for the name is said to be by the King Vikramāditya from Lord Ram's wife Sita.

Administration
The district is divided into 7 Tehsils: Sitapur, Biswan, Mishrikh, Maholi, Laharpur, Mahmoodabad and Sidhauli. There are 19 blocks, 4 parliamentary constituencies  (Sitapur, Mishrikh (SC), Mohanlalganj, Dhaurhara), 9 assembly constituencies (Sevata, Biswan, Mahmoodabad, Sidhauli (SC), Laharpur, Sitapur, Hargaon (SC), Mishrikh and Maholi), 19 Blocks and 26 Police Stations. Total population of the district is 44.84 lakh and the area is 5,743 km2. There are 2,348 census villages and 1,601 Gram Panchayats in the district. The Vehicle UP-34 is Registered in Sitapur RTO Transport office.

Transportation

Rail
Sitapur has 2 railway stations. Sitapur is well connected to Lucknow, Lakhimpur Mailani, Bhurwal, Gonda, Gorakhpur and Moradabad by broad gauge line. It also has a branch line b/w SITAPUR city and BALAMAU Jn in Hardoi district.

 
The major railway station is Sitapur Junction railway station. Some express trains like Jan Sadharan Express, Jan Nayak Express, Amritsar-Saharsa Express, Karmabhoomi Express and Jansewa Express. 

The other important station is Sitapur City Junction railway station/SPC. Couple of Express trains stops here. 

Sitapur also well connected by NH24 FROM LUCKNOW TO DELHI

Stadium
Sitapur has a stadium named after the Major Dhyan Chand.

Notable people
 Captain Manoj Kumar Pandey - Captain Manoj Kumar Pandey, PVC was an officer of the Indian Army who was posthumously awarded India's highest military honour, the Param Vir Chakra, for his audacious courage and leadership during the Kargil War in 1999.

 Wajahat Mirza – Indian screenwriter and film director
 Ilyas Sitapuri - An Indian born Pakistani historical fiction writer

Politics 
As the seat of the government of Uttar Pradesh, Lucknow is the site of the Uttar Pradesh Vidhan Sabha, Sitapur has 2 Loksabha seats and 9 Vidhan Sabha seats.

References

External links

 NIC Website
 Sitapur travel guide

Sitapur
Cities in Uttar Pradesh